Playing for Change, is an album by trumpeter Jack Sheldon which was recorded in 1986 and released by the Uptown label in 1997.

Reception

On AllMusic Ken Dryden states, "Jack Sheldon is probably better known for his trumpet playing on other musicians' record dates, but this 1986 studio date more than proves he is a capable leader ... Recommended". In JazzTimes, Chuck Berg wrote" Jack Sheldon-TV actor, antic vocalist and cut-up extraordinaire-also happens to be one hell of a trumpeter. Here, in a superb session from 1986, we get a telling reminder of just how compelling the Sheldon jazz persona is ... Whatever the tempo, and there are some scorchers, it’s Sheldon’s gorgeous tone and plucky melodism that impresses first, last and always. ... Throughout, the band cooks at a simmer apropos to the session’s dialogic intimacy. It’s serious fun at the mainstream summit".

Track listing
 "Angel Eyes" (Matt Dennis, Earl Brent) – 4:39
 "Along Came Betty" (Benny Golson) – 5:52
 "Ne Quittez Pas" (Bobby Porcelli) – 5:12
 "You Better Go Now" (Irvin Graham, Bickley Reichner) – 3:44
 "The Chase" (Tadd Dameron) – 4:54
 "Dear Ann" (Paul Chambers) – 5:19
 "Wait and See" (Jack Sheldon) – 3:17
 "That Old Feeling" (Sammy Fain, Lew Brown) – 5:39
 "Follow Me" (Cecil Payne) – 4:03
 "Just for a Thrill" (Lil Hardin Armstrong, Don Raye) – 4:58
 "Trane's Strain" (Curtis Fuller) – 4:43
 "No Trump" (Jerry Dodgion) – 4:58
 "Nancy" (Jimmy Van Heusen, Phil Silvers) – 5:51

Personnel
Jack Sheldon – trumpet, arranger
Jerry Dodgion – alto saxophone
Barry Harris – piano
Rufus Reid – double bass
Ben Riley – drums
Don Sickler – flugelhorn (track 2), arranger (tracks 1-6 & 9-13)

References

Jack Sheldon albums
1997 albums
Uptown Records (jazz) albums
Albums recorded at Van Gelder Studio